Time Flies is a greatest hits album by American rock band Huey Lewis and the News, released in 1996. The album also features four previously unreleased tracks. This marks the first time "The Power of Love" was available on an International Huey Lewis and the News album (it had previously been available on the UK release of the Fore! album). The song "So Little Kindness" was later included on the 2001 album Plan B as Lewis felt it needed a second chance. The song "100 Years From Now" was originally conceived for a planned Huey Lewis solo album that was later cancelled.

Track listing
"The Heart of Rock & Roll" (Johnny Colla, Huey Lewis) – 5:04
"Heart and Soul" (Mike Chapman, Nicky Chinn) – 4:12
"Doing It All for My Baby" (Mike Duke, Phil Cody) – 3:37
"Do You Believe in Love" (Robert John Lange) – 3:28
"Trouble in Paradise" (live) (Colla, Bill Gibson, Chris Hayes, Sean Hopper, Lewis, Mario Cipollina) – 4:32
"The Power of Love" (Hayes, Lewis, Colla) – 3:54
"If This Is It" (Colla, Lewis) – 3:52
"Bad Is Bad" (Alex Call, John Ciambotti, Hopper, Lewis, John McFee, Michael Schreiner) – 3:47
"Workin' for a Livin'" (Hayes, Lewis) – 2:39
"It's Alright" (Curtis Mayfield) – 3:04
"Stuck with You" (Hayes, Lewis) – 4:26
"I Want a New Drug" (Hayes, Lewis) – 4:45
"100 Years from Now" (Marcel East, Nathan East, Lewis) – 3:46
"So Little Kindness" (Hayes, Lewis, Rob Sudduth) – 4:14
"'Til the Day After" (Joe White, Steve Carter, Hopper) – 3:27
"When the Time Has Come" (Hayes, Lewis) – 4:26

"Trouble in Paradise" is a live recording that was included on the 1985 album We Are the World.
"It's Alright" is an a cappella cover that was included on the 1993 album People Get Ready: A Tribute to Curtis Mayfield.
The last four tracks were new recordings for this album.

Personnel
Huey Lewis and the News
Huey Lewis – harmonica, vocals
Johnny Colla – guitar, saxophone, backing vocals
Bill Gibson – drums, backing vocals
Chris Hayes – guitar, backing vocals
Sean Hopper – keyboards, backing vocals
Mario Cipollina – bass (tracks 1-12)
John Pierce – bass (tracks 13-16)

Additional personnel
Marvin McFadden – trumpet
Ron Stallings – tenor saxophone
Rob Sudduth – baritone saxophone, tenor saxophone
Jack Jacobsen – organ
Joe White (a.k.a. Joseph Andre' White) – backing vocals
Alexandria "Sandy" Griffith – backing vocals
Conesha Owens – backing vocals
Tower of Power

Production
Producers: Huey Lewis and the News ("It's Alright" HLN and Joseph Andre' White)
Engineers: Jim Gaines, Phil Kaffel, Bob Missbach, Jim "Watts" Vereecke, Kevin Scott, Andy Taub
Mixing: Bob Clearmountain, Malcolm Pollack, Dave Musgrove
Originally mastered by: Ted Jensen at Sterling Sound (tracks: 1, 2, 7, 8, 12), Bob Ludwig at Masterdisk (tracks: 3 to 5, 9 to 11), Steve Hall at Future Disc Systems (track 6)
Compilation mastered by: Bob Ludwig at Gateway Studios, Portland, Maine
Art direction and design: Jim deBarros
Photography: A. Binkley, Norm Fisher, Robin Kaplan, Ross Marino, Jim McNaughton, Ralph Merzlak, Roger Ressmeyer, Ron Slenzak, Robert Specter

Charts

References

1996 greatest hits albums
Huey Lewis and the News albums
Elektra Records compilation albums